Ernest Guy Diehl (October 2, 1877 – November 6, 1958) was a Major League Baseball outfielder who played for four seasons. He played for the Pittsburgh Pirates from 1903 to 1904, and the Boston Beaneaters/Doves in 1906 and 1909.

Diehl served as the head baseball coach at the University of Cincinnati in 1910.

Diehl also played tennis. At the tournament now known as the Cincinnati Masters he:
 reached two singles semifinals (1899 & 1903)
 reached two singles quarterfinals (1902 & 1904)
 reached the singles round of 16 twice (1900 & 1901)
 won two doubles titles (1902 & 1903, both with Nat Emerson)
 won one mixed doubles title (1902) and reached another mixed doubles final (1903), both with Winona Closterman)
 reached another doubles final (1900, with Nat Emerson)

References

External links
 , or Retrosheet
 
From Club Court to Center Court by Phillip S. Smith (2008 Edition)

1877 births
1958 deaths
Baseball coaches from Ohio
Baseball players from Cincinnati
Tennis players from Cincinnati
Boston Beaneaters players
Boston Doves players
Cincinnati Bearcats baseball coaches
Major League Baseball outfielders
Pittsburgh Pirates players
Toledo Mud Hens players